The Stonehenge Air Museum, located near Fortine,  Montana, is a 501(c)3 non-profit aviation museum with over two dozen vintage aircraft, including a rare example of an airworthy Mk 47 Seafire.

The Crystal Lakes Resort Airport at the Stonehenge Air Museum is for use by invitation only except in case of an emergency.

See also
List of aviation museums

References

External links
 
 
 

Aerospace museums in Montana